Stary Kamień may refer to the following places:
Stary Kamień, Masovian Voivodeship (east-central Poland)
Stary Kamień, Podlaskie Voivodeship (north-east Poland)
Stary Kamień, Pomeranian Voivodeship (north Poland)